Rohrgraben is a river of Thuringia, Germany.

It is a right tributary of the Werra near , a district of Bad Salzungen.

See also
List of rivers of Thuringia

References

Rivers of Thuringia
Rivers of Germany